Los Hombres Malo is the seventh studio album by American rock band Outlaws. It was released in 1982 on Arista Records. It is the first album without songwriter/guitarist Billy Jones.

Music 
The songs on Los Hombres Malo incorporate elements of hard rock, album-oriented rock, pop and country pop.

Track listing 
"Don't Stop" (Salem) – 5:03
"Foxtail Lilly" (Thomasson) – 4:32
"Rebel Girl" (Peterik, Smith) – 4:27
"Goodbye" (Salem) – 4:29
"Back from Eternity" (Thomasson) – 4:30
"Won't Come Out of the Rain" (Cua, Cua, DeRollo, Lyons) – 4:03
"Running" (Russo) – 4:25
"Easy Does It" (Cua, DeRollo) – 3:32
"All Roads" (Hagar, Peterik) – 4:31

Personnel 
Rick Cua – bass, vocals, backing vocals
David Dix – percussion, drums
Gary Lyons – keyboards, vocals, backing vocals
Freddie Salem – guitar, vocals, backing vocals
Hughie Thomasson – banjo, guitar, vocals, backing vocals

Guests
Dave Lane – fiddle, violin
Carol Bristow – vocals, backing vocals
Lu Moss – vocals, backing vocals

Production
Producer: Gary Lyons
Engineers: Gary Lyons, Pete Thea
Assistant engineer: Les Horn, Phil Bonanno
Mastering: George Marino
Art direction: Neal Pozner
Design: Neal Pozner
Cover illustration: Bob Peak

Charts 
Album

References 

Outlaws (band) albums
1982 albums
Arista Records albums